The  Edmonton Eskimos finished 3rd in the West Division with an 11–7 record and won the Grey Cup. This was the last season in their 34-year streak of making the playoffs.

Offseason

CFL Draft

Notable transactions

Preseason

Schedule

Regular season

Season standings

Season schedule

Total attendance: 377,408 
Average attendance: 41,934 (69.8%)

Playoffs

West Semi-Final

West Final

Grey Cup

Awards and records

All-Star selections

References

Edmonton Eskimos
Edmonton Elks seasons
Grey Cup championship seasons